Taxation in Georgia may refer to:

Taxation in Georgia (country)
Taxation in Georgia (U.S. state)